Andrea Soddu (born 18 December 1974 in Nuoro, Italy) is an Italian politician.

He ran as an independent for Mayor of Nuoro at the 2015 Italian local elections, supported by a civic coalition and the Sardinian Action Party. He took office on 16 June 2015. In November 2020, Soddu is re-confirmed mayor of Nuoro for a second term.

See also
2015 Italian local elections
2020 Italian local elections
List of mayors of Nuoro

References

External links
 

1974 births
Living people
Mayors of Nuoro
People from Nuoro